Jonatan Ezequiel Cristaldo (born 5 March 1989), nicknamed "Churry", is an Argentine professional footballer who plays as a striker for Newell's Old Boys in the Argentine Primera División.

Club career
Cristaldo made his debut for Vélez Sársfield in a 0–2 home defeat to Rosario Central on 22 April 2007 in the 2007 Clausura. He scored his first goal also in a home game against Rosario Central (2–1 victory) in the 2008 Clausura.

Cristaldo won his first Argentine league championship with Vélez in the 2009 Clausura. During the championship, he was at first a substitute for the striking partners Hernán Rodrigo López and Joaquín Larrivey; however as of the 11th fixture, he became a regular starter along López in the attack. Nonetheless, a meniscus injury suffered in the penultimate fixture against Lanús left him out of the final game against runners-up Huracán, in which the tournament was decided. In total, the striker played 14 games and scored 4 goals during the competition.

In the following semester, Cristaldo started by scoring in Vélez' 1–0 home victory over Boca Juniors in the first round of the 2009 Copa Sudamericana, securing his team's qualification. He was also, along Maximiliano Moralez, his team's top scorer on that semester's league championship (2009 Apertura) with 5 goals in 13 games. One of his goals was scored with a bicycle kick from outside the penalty area (6th fixture 2–0 win over Huracán).

Cristaldo started 2010 suffering an injury that left him out of most of Vélez' Clausura tournament and Copa Libertadores games. He only played 4 league games in the semester, all of them coming on from the bench. In the second semester, he was mostly a substitute for the striker partnership of Juan Manuel Martínez and Santiago Silva (who together scored 21 goals). However, he saw action regularly, coming on as a substitute in 16 of the 19 games of the tournament (he also played one as a starter). He ended the semester with 5 league goals, and one more in the Copa Sudamericana.

In January 2011, Cristaldo joined Ukrainian FC Metalist Kharkiv, that bought 80% of the player's transfer rights from Vélez Sársfield for a US$5 million fee.

In August 2014, Cristaldo joined Brazilian side Palmeiras, signing a four-year deal.

In June 2016, Mexican side Cruz Azul confirmed the signing of Cristaldo from Palmeiras for a fee that was reported to be in the region of US$3 million.

After a six-month loan spell with Monterrey, Cristaldo returned to play for Vélez Sarsfield on a free transfer, for the 2017–18 Argentine Primera División.

International career

In January 2009, Cristaldo was selected to represent the Argentina national under-20 football team at the South American Youth Championship. During the first round, he was a starter in the attack along Andrés Ríos, but lost his place in the final round. Argentina did not qualify for the World Cup, and Cristaldo ended the tournament with 8 games and 2 goals.

One year later, in January 2010, the striker was selected by Diego Maradona, coach of the Argentina national team, to play a friendly match against Costa Rica, in a squad formed by Argentine league players. Cristaldo was an unused substitute in the game.

New manager Sergio Batista handed Cristaldo his full international debut in the 2–1 defeat against Poland in June 2011.

International appearances and goals

Career statistics

Honours

Vélez Sársfield
Argentine Primera División (1): 2009 Clausura

Palmeiras
Copa do Brasil: 2015
 Campeonato Brasileiro A: 2016

References

External links
 Profile at Vélez Sarsfield's official website 
 Profile at Palmeiras' official website 
 
 

1989 births
Living people
Sportspeople from Buenos Aires Province
Argentine footballers
Argentina under-20 international footballers
Argentine expatriate footballers
Expatriate footballers in Ukraine
Expatriate footballers in Italy
Expatriate footballers in Brazil
Expatriate footballers in Mexico
Association football forwards
Argentine Primera División players
Ukrainian Premier League players
Serie A players
Campeonato Brasileiro Série A players
Liga MX players
Club Atlético Vélez Sarsfield footballers
FC Metalist Kharkiv players
Bologna F.C. 1909 players
Sociedade Esportiva Palmeiras players
Cruz Azul footballers
C.F. Monterrey players
Argentina international footballers
Argentine expatriate sportspeople in Ukraine